The World Open Under-16 Snooker Championships is a non-professional junior snooker tournament, held for the first time in Saint Petersburg, Russia, in October 2017. The event is endorsed by the International Billiards and Snooker Federation (IBSF).

Winners

Boys

Girls

See also
 IBSF World Under-18 Snooker Championship
 IBSF World Under-21 Snooker Championship
 IBSF World Snooker Championship

References

External links
 International Billiards & Snooker Federation

Snooker amateur competitions
World championships in snooker
Recurring sporting events established in 2017
Under-16 sport